Adelio Rubén Salinas Vallejos (born April 18, 1968) is a former Paraguayan footballer who played for clubes of Paraguay, Argentina, Chile and Indonesia.

Teams
  Cerro Corá 1990-1993
  Estudiantes de La Plata 1994
  Cerro Corá 1995-1997
  Everton 1997-1998
  Deportes Ovalle 1999-2001
  Unión La Calera 2002
  Naval 2003
  Persebaya Surabaya 2004-2005

External links
 Adelio Salinas at playmakerstats.com (English version of ceroacero.es)
 Adelio Salinas at En una Baldosa 

1968 births
Living people
Paraguayan footballers
Paraguayan expatriate footballers
Cerro Corá footballers
Estudiantes de La Plata footballers
Everton de Viña del Mar footballers
Deportes Ovalle footballers
Unión La Calera footballers
Naval de Talcahuano footballers
Primera B de Chile players
Argentine Primera División players
Expatriate footballers in Chile
Expatriate footballers in Argentina
Expatriate footballers in Indonesia
Association footballers not categorized by position